Listed are notable wrestlers who were competitors in either freestyle, Greco-Roman, or collegiate wrestling styles. These wrestlers are not to be confused with professional wrestling, and famous for their amateur wrestling success.

Armenia 
Alfred Ter-Mkrtychyan – 1992 Olympic silver medalist (for Unified Team)
Ara Abrahamian – 2004 Olympic silver medalist (for Sweden)
Artem Teryan – 1952 Olympic bronze medalist (for Soviet Union)
Artur Aleksanyan – 2012 Olympic bronze medalist, 2014 and 2015 World champion
Arsen Julfalakyan – 2012 Olympic silver medalist
Armen Mkrtchyan – 1996 Olympic silver medalist
Armen Nazaryan – 1996 Olympic gold medalist, 2000 Olympic gold medalist (for Bulgaria), 2004 Olympic bronze medalist (for Bulgaria)
Levon Julfalakyan – 1988 Olympic gold medalist (for Soviet Union)
Mkkhitar Manukyan – 2004 Olympic bronze medalist (for Kazakhstan)
Roman Amoyan – 2008 Olympic bronze medalist, 2006 and 2011 European champion

Azerbaijan 
Namig Abdullayev – 2000 Olympic gold medalist, 1996 Olympic silver medalist
Emin Ahmadov – 2012 Olympics bronze medalist
Toghrul Asgarov – 2012 Olympic gold medalist
Rovshan Bayramov – 2008 Olympic silver medalist, 2012 Olympic silver medalist
Khetag Gazyumov – 2008 Olympic bronze medalist, 2012 Olympic bronze medalist
Farid Mansurov – 2004 Olympic gold medalist
Vitaliy Rahimov – 2008 Olympic silver medalist
Sharif Sharifov – 2012 Olympic gold medalist

Australia 
Richard Garrard – 1948 Olympic silver medalist
Eddie Scarf – 1932 Olympic bronze medalist

Austria 
Nikolaus Hirschl – 1932 Olympic 2 time bronze medalist, European Heavyweight Wrestling Champion, 10 time Austrian Heavyweight Wrestling Champion

Belarus 
Dmitry Debelka – 2000 Olympic bronze medalist
Viachaslau Makaranka – 2004 Olympic bronze medalist
Valeriy Tsilent – 1996 Olympic bronze medalist

Belgium 

Joseph Mewis – 1956 Olympic silver medalist

Bulgaria 
Armen Nazarian – 2004 Olympic bronze medalist, 1996&2000 Olympic gold medalist
Valentin Yordanov – 1996 Olympic gold medalist in up to 52 kg weight class, seven times World Champion (1983, '85, '87, '89, '93, '94, and '95), seven times European Champion (1982, '83, '85, '86, '87, '88, and '89), and is the only wrestler to hold 10 World Championship medals (7 gold, 2 silver and 1 bronze).
Ivan Radnev – 1994 World silver medalist
Dimitar Dobrev – 1960 Olympic gold medalist (73 – 79 kg), 1956 Olympic silver medalist (73 – 79 kg)
Petko Sirakov – 1956 Olympic silver medalist (79 – 87 kg)
Nikola Stanchev – 1956 Olympic gold medalist (73 – 79 kg)
Hussein Mehmedov – 1956 Olympic silver medalist (+ 87 kg)
Dinko Petrov – 1960 Olympic bronze medalist (52 – 57 kg)
Krali Bimbalov – 1960 Olympic silver medalist (79 – 87 kg)
Nezhdet Zalev – 1960 Olympic silver medalist (52 – 57 kg)
Stancho Ivanov – 1960 Olympic silver medalist (57 – 62 kg)
Enyu Valchev – 1960 Olympic bronze medalist (62 – 67 kg), 1964 Olympic gold medalist (62 – 67 kg), 1968 Olympic silver medalist (63 – 70 kg), 1962 World gold medalist (62 – 67 kg)
Angel Kerezov – 1964 Olympic silver medalist (- 52 kg)
Kiril Todorov – 1964 Olympic silver medalist (70 – 78 kg)
Boyan Radev – 1964 Olympic gold medalist (87 – 97 kg), 1968 Olympic gold medalist (87 – 97 kg)
Stancho Kolev – 1964 Olympic silver medalist (57 – 63 kg)
Prodan Gardzhev – 1964 Olympic gold medalist (78 – 87 kg), 1968 Olympic bronze medalist (78 – 87 kg)
Said Mustafov – 1964 Olympic bronze medalist (87 – 97 kg)
Lyutvi Akhmedov – 1964 Olympic silver medalist (+ 97 kg)
Enyu Todorov – 1968 Olympic silver medalist (57 – 63 kg)
Osman Duraliev – 1968 Olympic silver medalist (+ 97 kg)
Petar Kirov – 1968 Olympic gold medalist (- 52 kg), 1972 Olympic gold medalist (48 – 52 kg)
Ognyan Nikolov – 1972 Olympic silver medalist (- 48 kg)
Ivan Krastev – 1972 Olympic bronze medalist (57 – 62 kg)
Osman Duraliev – 1972 Olympic silver medalist (+ 100)
Stefan Angelov – 1972 Olympic bronze medalist (- 48 kg), 1976 Olympic bronze medalist (- 48 kg)
Georgi Markov – 1972 Olympic gold medalist (57 – 62 kg)
Stoyan Apostolov – 1972 Olympic silver medalist (62 – 68 kg)
Aleksandar Tomov – 1972 Olympic silver medalist (+ 100), 1976 Olympic silver medalist (+ 100), 1980 Olympic silver medalist (+ 100)
Khasan Isaev – 1976 Olympic gold medalist (- 48 kg)
Dimo Kostov – 1976 Olympic bronze medalist (90 – 100 kg)
Ivan Kolev – 1976 Olympic bronze medalist (74 – 82 kg)
Stoyan Ivanov – 1976 Olympic silver medalist (82 – 90 kg)
Kamen Goranov – 1976 Olympic silver medalist (90 – 100 kg)
Nermedin Selimov – 1980 Olympic bronze medalist (48 – 52 kg)
Miho Dukov – 1980 Olympic silver medalist (57 – 62 kg)
Ivan Yankov – 1980 Olympic silver medalist (62 – 68 kg)
Valentin Raychev – 1980 Olympic gold medalist (68 – 74 kg)
Ismail Abilov – 1980 Olympic gold medalist (74 – 82 kg)
Slavcho Chervenkov – 1980 Olympic silver medalist (90 – 100 kg)
Mladen Mladenov – 1980 Olympic bronze medalist (48 – 52 kg)
Pavel Pavlov – 1980 Olympic bronze medalist (74 – 82 kg)
Georgi Raikov – 1980 Olympic gold medalist (90 – 100 kg)
Ivan Tzonov – 1988 Olympic silver medalist (- 48 kg)
Simeon Shterev – 1988 Olympic bronze medalist (57 – 62 kg)
Rahmat Sukra – 1988 Olympic bronze medalist (68 – 74 kg)
Bratan Tzenov – 1988 Olympic bronze medalist (- 48 kg)
Stoyan Balov – 1988 Olympic silver medalist (52 – 57 kg)
Zhivko Vangelov – 1988 Olympic silver medalist (57 – 62 kg)
Atanas Komchev – 1988 Olympic gold medalist (82 – 90 kg)
Rangel Gerovski – 1988 Olympic silver medalist (+ 130 kg)
Valentin Yordanov – 1992 Olympic bronze medalist (48 – 52 kg), 1996 Olympic gold medalist (48 – 52 kg)
Valentin Getsov – 1992 Olympic silver medalist (62 – 68 kg)
Serafim Barzakov – 2000 Olympic silver medalist (58 – 63 kg)
Radoslav Velikov – 2008 Olympic bronze medalist (- 54 kg)
Kiril Terziev – 2008 Olympic bronze medalist (66 – 74 kg)
Yavor Yanakiev – 2008 Olympic bronze medalist (66 – 74 kg)

Canada 
Gary Bohay (born 1960) – 1989 World silver medalist
Andy Borodow (born 1969) - Canadian Olympic wrestler, Maccabiah champion, Commonwealth champion
Daniel Igali – 2000 Olympic gold medalist, 1 World Champion Gold, World Hall of Fame
Garry Kallos (born 1956) - wrestler and sambo competitor
Guivi Sissaouri – 1996 Olympic silver medalist, 1 World Champion, 1 World Silver, 2 time World Bronze
Howard Stupp (born 1955) - Olympian, won five Canadian championships (1976, 1978, 1979, 1980, 1981), two Pan Am Games titles (1975, 1979), two Canadian Interuniversity Athletics Union championships, and four titles at the Maccabiah Games in Israel
Tonya Verbeek – 2004 & 2012 Olympic Silver, 2008 Olympic Bronze, 2011 World Silver, 2005 & 2009 World Bronze
Christine Nordhagen (born 1971) – 6x World Champion, 3x World Silver, 1 World Bronze, World Hall of Fame
Carol Huynh – 2008 Olympic Champion, 2012 Olympic Bronze, World Hall of Fame
Martine Dugrenier – 2008, 2009, 2010 World gold medalist, 2005, 2006, 2007 World silver medalist, World Hall of Fame
Jessica MacDonald – 2012 World gold medalist, 2011 & 2013 World bronze medalist
Erica Wiebe – 2016 Olympic Champion, 2019 & 2018 World bronze medalist
Justina Di Stasio – 2018 World gold medalist, 2017 World bronze medalist
Linda Morais – 2019 World gold medalist, 2016 World bronze medalist

China 
Wang Xu – 2004 Olympic gold medalist
Sheng Zetian – 2000 Olympic bronze medalist

Cuba 
Feliberto Ascuy – 1996, 2000 Olympic gold medalists
Yandro Miguel Quintana – 2004 Olympic gold medalist
Juan Marén – 1992 Olympic bronze medalist, 1996, 2000 Olympic silver medalists
Alexis Vila – 1996 Olympic bronze medalists
Roberto Monzon – 2004 Olympic silver medalist
Iván Fundora – 2004 Olympic bronze medalist, 2007 World Bronze 
Yoel Romero – 2000 Olympic silver medalist, world champion, world second twice, world third twice
Alexis Rodríguez – 2000 Olympic bronze medalist, 1998 world gold, 2001 world silver
Lázaro Rivas – 2000 Olympic silver, 1999 world gold, 2003 & 2001 World bronze
Mijaín López – three-time Olympic champion, five-time world champion, three-time world second
Liván López – 2012 Olympic bronze, 2013 World Bronze, 2014 & 2011 World Bronze
Ismael Borrero – 2016 Olympic gold, 2019 & 2015 world gold medalist 
Yasmany Lugo – 2016 Olympic silver medalist

Czechoslovakia 

Josef Urban – 1932 Olympic silver medalist

Denmark 

Henrik Hansen – 1948 Olympic bronze medalist

Egypt 
Ibrahim Moustafa – 1928 Olympic gold medalist, Egypt's first Olympic Medal
Karam Ibrahim – 2004 Olympic gold medalist ((Greco-Roman)) was offered to work for WWE but turned down the offer as he's currently interested in Mixed Martial Arts competition
Mohamed Abdelfatah – 2006 World gold medalist ((Greco-Roman)) most decorated wrestler in Africa

Estonia 
August Neo – 1936 Olympic silver medalist in Freestyle and Bronze in Greco-Roman 
Kristjan Palusalu – 1936 Olympic gold medalist Greco-Roman, 1936 Olympic gold medalist Freestyle.
Voldemar Väli – 1928 Olympic gold medalist, 1932 Olympic bronze medalist
Johannes Kotkas – 1952 Olympic gold medalist Greco-Roman, 1953 World Championships silver medalist Greco-Roman
Heiki Nabi – 1996 World Champion Greco-Roman wrestling, 2012 Olympic silver medalist, 2013 World Championships silver medalist Greco-Roman
Eduard Pütsep – 1924 Olympic gold medalist Greco-Roman wrestling
Osvald Käpp – 1928 Olympic gold medalist Greco-Roman wrestling
August Englas – 1953 World Champion Greco-Roman wrestling, 1954 World Champion Freestyle wrestling
Albert Kusnets – 1928 Olympic bronze medalist Greco-Roman wrestling
Roman Steinberg – 1924 Olympic bronze medalist Greco-Roman wrestling
August Kippasto – 1912 Olympian
Martin Klein – 1912 Olympic silver medalist

France 
Frank Chamizo – 2016 Olympic gold medalist
Henri Deglane – 1924 Olympic gold medalist
Anna Gomis – 2004 Olympic bronze medalist
Lise Legrand – 2004 Olympic bronze medalist

Finland 

Marko Yli-Hannuksela – 2004 Olympic silver medalist, 2000 Olympic bronze medalist
Marko Asell – 1996 silver medalist

Georgia 
Ramaz Nozadze – 2004 Olympic silver medalist

Germany 
Carl Schuhmann – 1896 Olympic gold medalist
Arawat Sabejew – 1996 Olympic bronze medalist
Fritz Schäfer – 1936 Olympic silver medalist
Alexander Leipold – originally awarded gold at the 2000 Olympics, but was stripped after testing positive for nandrolone

Great Britain 
Archie MacDonald – 1924 Olympic bronze medalist
Kenneth Richmond – 1952 Olympic bronze medalist
Noel Loban – 1984 Olympic bronze medalist

Greece 
Georgios Tsitas – 1896 Olympic silver medalist
Stephanos Christopoulos – 1896 Olympic bronze medalist
Petros Galaktopoulos – 1972 Olympic silver medalist
Stelios Mygiakis – 1980 Olympic gold medalist, only non Russian wrestler win a Gold medal inside USSR
Haralampos Holidis – 1984 Olympic bronze medalist, 1988 Olympic bronze medalist
Dimitrios Thanopoulos – 1984 Olympic silver medalist
Amiran Karntanov – 2000 Olympic bronze medalist

Hungary 
Sandor Istvan Bardozi – 2000 Olympic silver medalist
Garry Kallos (born 1956) - Hungarian-born Canadian wrestler and sambo competitor

India 

Sushil Kumar – 2012 Olympic silver medalist, 2008 Olympic bronze medalist & 2010 World Champion
Khashaba Jadhav – 1952 Olympic bronze medalist
Yogeshwar Dutt – 2012 Olympic bronze medalist

Iran 
Nasser Givehchi – 1952 Olympic silver medalist
Jahanbakht Tofigh – 1952 Olympic bronze medalist
Mahmoud Mollaghasemi – 1952 Olympic bronze medalist
Abdullah Mojtabavi – 1952 Olympic bronze medalist
Mohammad Ali Khojastépour – 1956 Olympic silver medalist
Mohammad Mehdi Yaghoubi – 1956 Olympic silver medalist
Gholamreza Takhti – 1956 Olympic gold medalist, 1952, 1960 Olympic silver medalists
Emamali Habibi Goudarzi – 1956 Olympic gold medalist
Mohammad Paziraye – 1960 Olympic bronze medalist
Mohammad Ebrahim Seifpour – 1960 Olympic bronze medalist
Said Ali Akbar Heidari – 1964 Olympic bronze medalist
Mohammad Ali Sanatkaran – 1964 Olympic bronze medalist
Abutaleb Gorgori – 1968 Olympic bronze medalist
Shamseddin Seyed-Abbasi – 1968 Olympic bronze medalist 
Abdollah Movahed – 1968 Olympic gold medalist
Ebrahim Javadi – 1972 Olympic bronze medalist
Rahim Aliabadi – 1972 Olympic silver medalist
Mansour Barzegar – 1976 Olympic silver medalist
Askari Mohammadian – 1988 Olympic silver medalist, 1992 Olympic silver medalist
Amirreza Khadem Azghadi – 1992, 1996 Olympic bronze medalists
Rasul Khadem Azghadi – 1996 Olympic gold medalist, 1992 Silver Olympic Medalist 
Abbas Jadidi – 1996 Olympic silver medalist
Alireza Dabir – 2000 Olympic gold medalist
Masoud Jokar – 2004 Olympic silver medalist
Alireza Rezaei – 2004 Olympic silver medalist
Masoud Mostafa-Jokar – 2004 Olympic silver medalist
Alireza Heidari – 2004 Olympic bronze medalist
Fardin Masoumi – 2008 Olympic bronze medalist
Morad Mohammadi – 2008 Olympic bronze medalist
Ghasem Rezaei – 2012 Olympic gold medalist, 2016 Bronze Olympic Medalist
Hamid Sourian – 2012 Olympic gold medalist
Omid Norouzi – 2012 Olympic gold medalist
Sadegh Goudarzi – 2012 Olympic silver medalist
Ehsan Lashgari – 2012 Olympic bronze medalist
Komeil Ghasemi – 2012 Olympic gold medalist, 2016 Silver Olympic Medalist
Hassan Yazdani – 2016 Olympic gold medalist
Saeid Abdevali – 2016 Olympic bronze medalist
Hassan Rahimi – 2016 Olympic bronze medalist

Italy 
Enrico Porro – 1908 Olympic gold medalist
Vincenzo Maenza – 1984, 1988 Olympic gold medalists, 1992 Olympic silver medalist
Andrea Minguzzi – 2008 Olympic gold medalist

Japan 
Osamu Watanabe – 1964 Olympic gold medalist and freestyle wrestling's only Olympic gold medalist to retire undefeated in competition
Kaori Icho – 2004 Olympic gold medalist
Kenji Inoue – 2004 Olympic bronze medalist
Chikara Tanabe – 2004 Olympic bronze medalist
Kyoko Hamaguchi – 2004 Olympic bronze medalist
 Yojiro Uetake – 1964 and 1968 olympic gold medalist and 3 time undefeated NCAA Champion at Oklahoma State University

Kazakhstan 
Georgiy Tsurtsumia – 2004 Olympic silver medalist
Mkkhitar Manukyan – 2004 Olympic bronze medalist
Gennadiy Laliyev – 2004 Olympic silver medalist
Islam Bairamukov – 2000 Olympic silver medalist
Yuriy Melnichenko – 1996 Olympic gold medalist
Doulet Tourlekhanov – 1988 Olympic silver medalist and 1987 World Champion

Korea, North 
Ri Yong-Sam – 1996 Olympic bronze medalist
Kang Yong-Gyun – 2000 Olympic bronze medalist
Kim II – 1996, 1992 Olympic gold medalists

Korea, South 
Moon Eui-Jae – 2000, 2004 Olympic silver medalists
Sim Kwon-Ho – 1996, 2000 Olympic gold medalists
Yang Jung-Mo – 1976 Olympic gold medalist

Lebanon 

Zakaria Chibab – 1952 Olympic silver medalist
Hassan Bchara – 1980 Olympic bronze medalist

Republic of Macedonia 
Mogamed Ibragimov – 2000 Olympic bronze medalist

Moldova 
Serguei Moureiko – 1996 Olympic bronze medalist

Mongolia 
Danzandarjaagiin Sereeter – 1968 Olympic bronze medalist
Tömöriin Artag – 1968 Olympic bronze medalist
Khorloogiin Bayanmönkh – 1972 Olympic silver medalist
Zevegiin Oidov – 1976 Olympic silver medalist

Norway 

Jon Rønningen – 1988 Olympic gold medalist
Aage Eriksen – 1948 Olympic silver medalist

Pakistan 
Muhammad Bashir – 1960 Olympic bronze medalist

Poland 

Jozef Tracz – 1996 Olympic bronze medalist

Romania 
Ioan Grigoras – 1992 Olympic bronze medalist

Russia 
Khasan Baroyev – 2004 Olympic gold medalist, 2008 Olympic silver medalist
Sazhid Sazhidov – 2004 Olympic bronze medalist
Alexander Karelin – FILA Greatest Wrestler of 20th Century (Greco-Roman), 1988, 1992, 1996 Olympic gold medalist, 2000 Olympic silver medalist, 9 X World Champion. He lost 1 match in 13 years to Rulon Gardner.
Buvaysa Saytiev – 1996, 2004, 2008 Olympic gold medalist and 5X World Champion
Resanchev Valeri – two-time Olympic gold medalist, 5-time World Champion
Varteres Samourgachev – 2000 Olympic gold medalist, 2004 Olympic bronze medalist
Makhach Murtazaliev – 2004 Olympic bronze medalist
Mavlet Batirov – 2004, 2008 Olympic gold medalist
Gouzel Maniourova – 2004 Olympic silver medalist
Alan Dudaev – 2005 World Champion
Khadjimourat Gatsalov – 2004 Olympic gold medalist
Nazir Mankiev – 2008 Olympic gold medalist
Islambek Albiev – 2008 Olympic gold medalist
Aslanbek Khushtov – 2008 Olympic gold medalist
Shirvani Muradov – 2008 Olympic gold medalist
Mourad Oumakhanov – 2000 Olympic gold medalist
Adam Saitiev – 2000 Olympic gold medalist
Sagid Murtazaliev – 2000 Olympic gold medalist
David Musulbes – 2000 Olympic gold medalist
Murat Kardanov – 2000 Olympic gold medalist
Alexei Michine – 2004 Olympic gold medalist
Khadzhimurad Magomedov – 1996 Olympic gold medalist
Vadim Bogiyev – 1996 Olympic gold medalist
 See USSR for all pre-1988 wrestlers in the Russian/USSR region.

Sweden 
Edvin Matiasson – 1908 Olympic bronze medalist
Erik Lindén – 1948 Olympic bronze medalist
Frank Andersson – 1984 Olympic bronze medalist
Mikael Ljungberg – 1996 Olympic bronze medalist, 2000 Olympic gold medalist
Martin Lidberg – 2003 World gold medalist, Multible European Medalist
Ara Abrahamian – 2004 Olympic silver medalist, later became known for his antics during 2008 Olympics where he was stripped of his bronze
Sofia Mattsson – 2007 European bronze medalist, 2008 European silver medalist
Johan Eurén – 2012 Olympic bronze medalist, 2013 World bronze medalist
Jimmy Lidberg – 2012 Olympic bronze medalist, 2009-11 World Medalist
Sofia Mattsson – 2016 Olympic bronze medalist, Multible World Medalist
Jenny Fransson – 2016 Olympic bronze medalist, Multible World Medalist

Switzerland 

Adolf Müller – 1948 Olympic bronze medalist

Turkey 
Yaşar Erkan – 1936 Olympic gold medalist
Yasar Dogu – 1948 Olympic gold medalist
Gazanfer Bilge – 1948 Olympic gold medalist
Hamza Yerlikaya –  1996, 2000 Olympic gold medalists
Nasuh Akar – 1948 Olympic gold medalist
Ahmet Kireççi – 1948 Olympic gold medalist, 1936 Olympic bronze medalist
Mustafa Dagistanli – 1956, 1960 Olympic gold medalists
Hamit Kaplan – 1956 Olympic gold medalist, 1960 Olympic silver medalist, 1964 Olympic bronze medalist
Mithat Bayrak – 1956, 1960 Olympic gold medalists
Müzahir Sille – 1960 Olympic gold medalist
Tevfik Kis – 1960 Olympic gold medalist
Ahmet Bilek – 1960 Olympic gold medalist
Hasan Güngör – 1960 Olympic gold medalist, 1964 Olympic silver medalist
Ismet Atli – 1960 Olympic gold medalist
Ismail Ogan – 1960 Olympic silver medalist
Mehmet Özal – 2004 Olympic bronze medalist
Aydin Polatci – 2004 Olympic bronze medalist
Şeref Eroğlu – 2004 Olympic silver medalist
Adem Bereket – 2000 Olympic bronze medalist

USSR 
Aleksandr Ivanov – 1976 Olympic silver medalist
Alexander Medved – 1964, 1968, 1972 Olympic gold medalist, FILA Greatest Wrestler of 20th Century (Freestyle)
Sergei Beloglazov – 1980, 1988 Olympic gold medalist, 6 time World Champion
Makharbek Khadartsev – 1988, 1992 Olympic gold medalist, 1996 Olympic silver medalist
Shazam Safin – 1952 Olympic gold medalist
Shamil Khisamutdinov – 1972 Olympic gold medalist
Farhat Mustafin – 1976 Olympic bronze medalist
Vladimir Bakulin − 1968 Olympic silver medalist
Ivan Koschergin – 1968 bronze medalist
Valentin Oleynick – 1968 silver medalist
Nikolai Yakovenko – 1968 silver medalist, 1972 silver medalist
Anatoli Roschtchin – 1968 silver medalist, 1972 gold medalist
Boris Gurowitsch – 1968 gold medalist
Shota Lomidze – 1968 silver medalist
Roman Dmitriev – 1972 gold medalist, 1976 silver medalist
Arsen Allakhverdiev − 1972 silver medalist
Zagalav Abdulbekov − 1972 gold medalist
Rouslan Ashuraliev – 1972 bronze medalist
Levan Tediashvili – 1972 gold medalist, 1976 gold medalist
gennadi Strachow – 1972 silver medalist
Ivan Yarygin – 1972 gold medalist, 1976 gold medalist
Roustan kasakov – 1972 gold medalist
Anatoli nazarenko – 1972 silver medalist
Valeri Resanzev – 1972 gold medalist, 1976 gold medalist
Alexej Shumakov – 1976 gold medalist
Vladimir Yumin – 1976 gold medalist
Pavel Pinigin – 1976 gold medalist
Viktor Novishilov – 1976 silver medalist
Soslan Andiev – 1976 gold medalist, 1980 gold medalist
Vitali Konstantinov – 1976 gold medalist
Nelson Davidyan – 1976 silver medalist
Suren Nalbandyan – 1976 gold medalist
Anatoly Bykov – 1976 gold medalist, 1980 silver medalist
Vladimir Tcheboksarov – 1976 silver medalist
Nikolai balboshin – 1976 gold medalist
Alexander Koltchinski – 1976 gold medalist, 1980 gold medalist
Magomed Arasilov – 1980 silver medalist
anatoli Belaglasov – 1980 gold medalist

Uzbekistan 
Artur Taymazov – 2012 Olympic gold medalist, 2008 Olympic gold medalist, 2004 Olympic gold medalist, 2000 Olympic silver medalist
Magomed Ibragimov – 2004 Olympic silver medalist
Alexandr Dokturishvili – 2004 Olympic gold medalist

Ukraine 
Irini Merleni – 2004 Olympic gold medalist
Elbrus Tedeyev – 2004 Olympic gold medalist, 1996 Olympic bronze medalist
Davyd Saldadze – 2000 Olympic silver medalist
Zaza Zazirov – 1996 Olympic bronze medalist

United Arab Republic 

Osman Sayed – 1960 Olympic silver medalist

USA 
Kyle Snyder – 2015: UWW world gold medalist (97 kg); Pan American Games champion (97 kg); NCAA Division I runner-up (197 lbs); Big Ten Conference runner-up (197 lbs); 2016: Olympic gold medalist (97 kg); Ivan Yarygin bronze medalist (97 kg); NCAA Division I champion (285 lbs); Most Outstanding Wrestler NCAA Division I championships; Big Ten Conference champion (285 lbs); 2017: UWW world gold medalist (97 kg); Ivan Yarygin gold medalist (97 kg); Pan American Championships gold medalist (97 kg); NCAA Division I champion (285 lbs); Big Ten Conference champion (285 lbs); 2018: Ivan Yarygin gold medalist (97 kg)
Jordan Burroughs – 2012 Olympic gold medalist, 4 time World Champion
Matt Ghaffari – 1996 Olympic silver medalist - Ghaffari is holder of 3 American Records; the only USA Greco- Roman wrestler with total of 4 World and Olympic Medals, plus 4 time World Cup Champion, also 9X Pan-American Champion! All 3 are USA Wrestling Records 
Robert Curry – 1904 Olympic gold medalist
Robin Reed – 1924 Olympic gold medalist, Never lost a match Official or nonofficial, pinned every opponent in the Olympics
Chester Newton – 1924 Olympic silver medalist
Bruce Baumgartner – 1984, 1992 Olympic gold medalist, 1988 Olympic silver medalist, 1996 Olympic bronze medalist.  Has won more Olympic medals than any USA wrestler in history.
John Smith – 1988, 1992 Olympic gold medalist, 4X World Champion. He is considered by some to be the best wrestler in USA history.
Pat Smith – younger brother of John; first wrestler to win four NCAA Division I titles.
Dan Gable – 1972 Olympic gold medalist, 1971 World Champion, first wrestler in history to not have one point scored on him in the Olympics 
Terrence McCann – 1960 Olympic gold medalist, founder of now USA Wrestling
Dave Schultz – 1984 Olympic gold medalist
Mark Schultz – 1984 Olympic gold medalist
Rulon Gardner –   2000 Olympic gold medalist, 2004 Olympic bronze medalist
Kenny Monday – 1988 Olympic gold medalist, 1992 Olympic silver medalist
Cael Sanderson – 2004 Olympic gold medalist, 4 time NCAA Champion 
Richard Voliva – 1936 Olympic silver medalist
Francis Millard – 1936 Olympic silver medalist
Frank Lewis – 1936 Olympic gold medalist
Glen Brand – 1948 Olympic gold medalist
Leland Merrill – 1948 Olympic bronze medalist
Henry Wittenberg – 1948 Olympic gold medalist, 1952 Olympic silver medalist
William Smith – 1952 Olympic gold medalist
Josiah Henson – 1952 Olympic bronze medalist
Peter Blair – 1956 Olympic bronze medalist
Danny Hodge – 1956 Olympic silver medalist
Shelby Wilson – 1960 Olympic gold medalist
Douglas Blubaugh – 1960 Olympic gold medalist
Daniel Brand – 1964 Olympic bronze medalist
Donald Behm – 1968 Olympic silver medalist
Dremiel Byers – 2002 World Champion, 3 time World medalist
Sergio Gonzales – 1972 Olympic Team Member
Richard Sanders – 1968, 1972 Olympic silver medalist
Chris Taylor – 1972 Olympic bronze medalist
John Peterson – 1972 Olympic silver medalist, 1976 Olympic gold medalist
Stanley Dziedzic – 1976 Olympic bronze medalist
Randall Lewis – 1984 Olympics gold medalist
Jamill Kelly – 2004 Olympics silver medalist
Jeff Blatnick – 1984 Olympic gold medalist
Russell Owen Hellickson – 1976 Olympic silver medalist
Lloyd Weldon Keaser – 1976 Olympic silver medalist
Kevin Jackson – 1992 Olympic gold medalist
Tom Brands – 1996 Olympic gold medalist
Terry Brands – 2000 Olympic bronze medalist, 2 time World Champion
Edward Banach – 1984 Olympic gold medalist
Louis Banach – 1984 Olympic gold medalist
Andrew Rein – 1984 Olympic silver medalist
Barry Davis – 1984 Olympic silver medalist
Steve Fraser – 1984 Olympic gold medalist
Lloyd Weldon Keaser – 1976 Olympic silver medalist
Eugene Lee Davis – 1976 Olympic bronze medalist
Matt James Lindland – 2000 Olympic silver medalist
Garrett Lowney – 2000 Olympic bronze medalist
Ben Peterson – 1972 Olympic gold medalist, 1976 Olympic silver medalist
Townsend Saunders – 1996 Olympic silver medalist
Zeke Jones – 1996 Olympic silver medalist
John Allan Peterson – 1976 Olympic gold medalist
Patricia Miranda – 2004 Olympic bronze medalist
Brandon Slay – 2000 Olympic gold medalist
Brandon Paulson – 1996 Olympic silver medalist
Dennis Hall – 1996 Olympic silver medalist
Sara McMann – 2004 Olympic silver medalist
Lincoln McIlravy – 2000 Olympic bronze medalist
Nate Carr – 1988 Olympic bronze medalist
Dennis Koslowski – 1992 Olympic silver medalist
William Scherr – 1988 Olympic bronze medalist
Robert Weaver – 1984 Olympics gold medalist
James Martinez – 1984 Olympic bronze medalist
Greg Gibson – 1984 Olympic silver medalist
Waldo Zhang – 1992 Olympics bronze medalist
Stephen Abas – 2004 Olympic silver medalist
Samuel Henson – 2000 Olympic silver medalist
Kurt Angle – 1996 Olympic gold medalist and later professional wrestler WWE Champion/ WCW Champion/TNA Champion
Henry Cejudo – 2008 Olympic gold medalist
Lindsey Durlacher – 2006 world bronze medalist
Joe Warren – 2006 World Champion
Ike Okoli – 2014 World bronze medalist and 2015 Pan-Am gold medalist (beach wrestling)
 Anthony Robles – NCAA Division I champion in 2011 despite being born with only one leg
 Kyle Dake – 4 time NCAA Division I champion, and the only wrestler to win NCAA titles in four different weight classes
 Logan Stieber – 4 time NCAA Division I champion

YUG 
Josip Čorak – 1972 Olympic silver medalist
Ivan Frgić – 1976 Olympic silver medalist
Stevan Horvat – 1968 Olympic silver medalist
Vlado Lisjak – 1984 Olympic gold medalist
Branislav Martinović – 1960 Olympic silver and 1964 bronze medalist
Refik Memišević – 1984 Olympic silver medalist
Milan Nenadić – 1972 Olympic bronze medalist
Momir Petković – 1976 Olympic gold medalist
Šaban Sejdiu – 1980 and 1984 Olympic bronze medalist
Branislav Simić – 1964 Olympic gold and 1968 bronze medalist
Jožef Tertei – 1984 Olympic bronze medalist
Šaban Trstena – 1984 Olympic gold and 1988 silver medalist

See also

References

Amateur
Amateur wrestling